Boorhwal Ahir is a village in Teh. Behror Alwar district, Rajasthan, India. It lies near the border of Jaipur state. it's part of ahirwal. It is 7 km from Sub-district headquarters and 70 km from District headquarters. It is 140 km from state capital and 120 km from national capital. The village is well known for its ancient temple which is named after BABA JOHAD WALA . The main occupation of people in this rural area is Agricultural. The Majority population in village mainly Yadavs.

Total house in village 450.

Total voter's 2250.

Boodhwal sarpanch = Kuldeep singh yadav.

Panchayat sameti member = Sunil kumar Yadav

Area7.77 km²

Population (2020)4264

Population Density548 people per km²

Male Population2178

Female Population2086

Nearest Railway Station & Distance Mirzapur Bachhaud, 12.53 km

Education 
      
        1. O.P Agricultural college 
        2. Gargi T.T college 
        3. Government senior secondary school
        4. Government Girls primary school
        5.aaganbadi Kendra

References

Villages in Alwar district